Lycanthropy is the mythological ability or power of a human being to undergo transformation into an animal like state, such as a werewolf.

Lycanthropy may also refer to:
 Clinical lycanthropy, the delusional belief that a person can transform into a wolf or other animal
 Lycanthropy (album), a 2003 album by Patrick Wolf
 "Lycanthropy," a song by Six Feet Under from Haunted
 "Lycanthropy", a song by Fear Before from The Always Open Mouth

See also
Lycanthrope (disambiguation)